Oiticella is a genus of moths in the family Saturniidae first described by Charles Duncan Michener in 1949.

Species
Oiticella brevis (Walker, 1855)
Oiticella convergens (Herrich-Schaeffer, 1855)
Oiticella luteciae (Bouvier, 1924)

References

Ceratocampinae